The Honda Stepwgn (stylised as STEPWGN, pronounced "step wagon") is a minivan produced by Honda since 1996. It is designed with a higher cabin, in contrast to the Odyssey and also the Stream respectively.  Additionally, it can accommodate eight people, instead of seven in the Odyssey and Stream. For its first two generations the car had one door on the driver's side and two doors on the passenger's side. The Honda Stepwgn competes against the Nissan Serena, Toyota Noah, Mitsubishi Delica, and formerly, the Mazda Biante.

First generation (RF1/2; 1996)

F-MX (1995)
The first generation Stepwgn originally appeared at the Tokyo Motor Show as the "F-MX" in 1995.

Initial release (1996) 
Japanese sales began on 8 May 1996. At that time, most rival Japanese vehicles usually had the engine mounted under the driver's seat, or a cabover type. The Stepwgn used the latter, and was based on the Civic, to keep prices low - starting from ¥1,548,000 and going up to ¥2,368,000. The passenger side was fitted with a sliding door, to allow easier access. To improve profitability, cost reduction measures were used, such as there being only one engine and transmission option; a two-litre inline-four and a CVT (continuously variable transmission automatic), and the vehicle design reduced the use of steel panels and parts.

1997 update
Changes for 1997 included standardizing ABS and dual SRS airbags throughout the range and further addition of a number of convenience features.

Japanese models went on sale in August 1997 at Honda's Primo, Verno and Clio networks.

Stepwgn Field Deck (1998)
A version of the Stepwgn with pop-up observation tent, designed for outdoor leisure pursuits and made out of fiber-reinforced plastic (FRP).

The models went on sale in Japan from January 1998, at Honda auto dealers.

1999 update
The vehicle received a facelift in May 1999. The appearance of the headlights was altered, and the rear license plate position was moved down.

Second generation (RF3/4/5/6/7/8; 2001)

Initial release

The second generation Stepwgn debuted in April 2001, largely based on the first generation's design.

The second generation Stepwgn used a design that was geared towards families with children. The Stepwgn retained its sliding doors located on one side of the vehicle. The vehicle's seating allows  four different seating arrangements: "play mode" (sitting opposite each other), "food mode", "sleep mode" and "cargo mode" (the second row of seats is folded flat). A 2.0L Honda K engine DOHC i-VTEC engine powers the second generation Stepwgn, providing , improving both driving performance and fuel economy. Some parts were stiffened in order to further enhance driving performance.

The vehicle was unveiled at the 35th Tokyo Motor Show.

Stepwgn, Stepwgn Almas (2001)
The Stepwgn Almas includes conventional side door lift model or passenger seat lift mechanism

Early models include i-Series 2.0-liter DOHC i-VTEC engine. Stepwgn Almas models went on sale on 11 June 2001.

2003 update
In June 2003, Honda significantly modified the design: both the front and rear fascias were altered to fit the look of other Honda vehicles, and the "Spada" series was introduced, available with a 2.4L K24A DOHC i-VTEC, producing , and unique fenders.

The vehicle was unveiled at the 37th Tokyo Motor Show in 2003.

Production
For the first 6 months of year 2004, sales of the Stepwgn in Japan reached 24,389 units.

Third generation (RG; 2005) 

The third generation Stepwgn had a much more aerodynamic design.

Honda announced the third generation Stepwgn on 26 May 2005. Unlike the previous generations, which only featured sliding doors on one side, the third generation featured sliding doors on both sides, in order to compete with other minivans such as the Nissan Serena and Toyota Noah. Although the size of the car was shrunk, interior accommodation space remained unchanged thanks to a new low-platform chassis which also improved the handling of the vehicle.  The overall length had also been shortened, although the platform retains the  Civic-based design and employs a thin plastic fuel tank in order to provide a low floor, which was covered in fake wood. The Stepwgn was available with a double wishbone-type suspension with an FF axle or a de-Dion style suspension (4WD models).

Japanese models went on sale in May 2005 at Honda automobile dealers.

2006 Tokyo Auto Salon concept (2006)
Modulo Stepwgn Concept is a concept vehicle based on Stepwgn, with around-vehicle sensors.

Stepwgn Modulo Concept X Final Room is a concept vehicle based on Stepwgn, with around-vehicle sensors.

The vehicles were unveiled at the 2006 Tokyo Auto Salon.

2006 update
Changes include:
addition of G side lift-up seat car and front passenger lift-up seat car models
G, G S-package, 24Z include power slide door (rear left side) as standard
G L-package, G LS-package include power slide door (rear right side) as standard
new setting for smart key system (with 2 keys)
hydrophilic/heated door mirror+front door wiper glass.

Japanese models went on sale in May 2006.

Timing Belt: The third generation uses a chain timing belt as the engine is an interference type. Timing chain is the better approach for interference engines as they last the life of the engine.

Engines
The third generation Stepwgn is powered by either a 2.0L K20A engine rated , or a 2.4L K24A engine rated .

Transmissions
The 2.0L model retained a 4-speed automatic transmission, whilst the FWD 2.4L model was fitted with a CVT transmission.

Production
At the month of November 2005, sales of Stepwgn in Japan reached 7,093 units.

Fourth generation (RK; 2009) 

The fourth generation Stepwgn is a full redesign of the model. The new model increased in height and length, but remained the same width, when compared to the previous generation. The Stepwgn Spada model returned, keeping its unique grille and headlamp design. The Stepwgn is available in seven trim levels: G, G L Package, L, Li, Spada S, Spada Z and Spada Zi. The 2.4-litre engine was dropped from the lineup, with only a 2.0-litre petrol option currently available. The Stepwgn is available with either front- or four-wheel-drive across the range.

Japanese models went on sale in October 2009. Early models include Stepwgn, Stepwgn special-needs vehicle. Stepwgn Spada and Stepwgn Spada special-needs vehicle were added on 23 October 2009.

Facelift
In 2012, there were minor changes to the Stepwgn, including a new front grille, a new front bumper, new rear lights and rims. Also, a parking camera was included in all models.

Modulo Stepwgn (2010)
The Modulo Stepwgn is a production vehicle based on the standard Stepwgn.

The vehicle was unveiled at the 2010 Tokyo Auto Salon.

Stepwgn Modulo Style (2013)
The Stepwgn Modulo Style is a concept vehicle based on the standard Stepwgn.

The vehicle was unveiled at the 2013 Tokyo Auto Salon.

Production
For the month of July 2013, sales of the Stepwgn reached 6,715 units.

Fifth generation (RP1–5; 2015) 

The fifth generation Stepwgn was introduced in April 2015. With an all-new 1.5-liter direct injection VTEC Turbo engine, the fifth generation Stepwgn features a functional cabin space, as well as an innovative tailgate mechanism called the Waku Waku Gate ("Waku Waku" meaning "exciting" in Japanese). The Waku Waku gate is a unique proposition as the rear doors either function as a wide tailgate that opens up or a sub-door that opens to the side. It can be used to get out of the third row seat smoothly and to easily store small cargo without folding.

Facelift 
The Stepwgn got refreshed in September 2017. The Stepwgn Spada Hybrid has a 3 mode powertrain which can switch to being run on EV, Hybrid, or Engine drive mode. It also has a Sport drive mode.

It is equipped with Honda Sensing and can park on its own perpendicularly and parallel by controlling steering.

Sixth generation (RP6–8; 2022) 

The sixth-generation Stepwgn was unveiled on 7 January 2022. It is available in three models: Air, Spada and Spada Premium Line. For this generation, the "Waku Waku Gate" mechanism was dropped, in favour of a conventional automatic tailgate release.

References

External links 

  (Japan)

Stepwgn
Cars introduced in 1996
2000s cars
2010s cars
2020s cars
Minivans
Front-wheel-drive vehicles
All-wheel-drive vehicles
Vehicles with CVT transmission
Hybrid minivans
Cars powered by transverse 4-cylinder engines